Capvern is a railway station in Capvern, Occitanie, France. The station is on the Toulouse–Bayonne railway line. The station is served by TER (local) services operated by the SNCF.

Train services
The following services currently call at Capvern:
local service (TER Occitanie) Toulouse–Saint-Gaudens–Tarbes–Pau

References

Railway stations in France opened in 1867
Railway stations in Hautes-Pyrénées